Hathor 5 - Coptic Calendar - Hathor 7

The sixth day of the Coptic month of Hathor, the third month of the Coptic year. On a common year, this day corresponds to November 2, of the Julian Calendar, and November 15, of the Gregorian Calendar. This day falls in the Coptic season of Peret, the season of emergence.

Commemorations

Saints 

 The departure of Pope Felix, the Patriarch of Rome

Other commemorations 

 The consecration of the Church of the Virgin Mary, in the Mouharaq Monastery, in Mount Quosqam

References 

Days of the Coptic calendar